Richie Kamuca (July 23, 1930 – July 22, 1977) was an American jazz tenor saxophonist.

Musical career
Kamuca was born in Philadelphia, Pennsylvania, United States, and, like many players associated with West Coast jazz, grew up in the East before moving West around the time that bebop changed the prevailing style of jazz. His early playing, in what is generally considered the Lester Young style, was done on tour with the big bands of Stan Kenton and Woody Herman, where he became a member of the later line-ups of Herman's Four Brothers saxophone section with Al Cohn and Bill Perkins.

Kamuca stayed on the West Coast, playing with the smaller groups of Chet Baker, Maynard Ferguson, Shorty Rogers, and others. He was one of the Lighthouse All-Stars in 1957 and 1958, and recorded with Perkins, Art Pepper, Jimmy Rowles, Cy Touff and many others in those years, as well as leading recording sessions in his own right.

Kamuca was a member of the group Shelly Manne and His Men from 1959 through 1962, when he returned East and settled in New York. Here he worked with Gerry Mulligan, Gary McFarland, and Roy Eldridge, before returning to the West Coast in 1972, where he recorded in the studios and performed with local groups.

Less well known to the general public than saxophonists like Stan Getz, who played in a similar Lester Young-derived style, Kamuca died of cancer, in Los Angeles, California, just before his 47th birthday.

Selected discography
 The Brothers! (RCA Victor, 1955) with Al Cohn and Bill Perkins
 Cy Touff and Richie Kamuca, Octet & Quintet (Pacific Jazz, 1955)
 Bill Perkins, Richie Kamuca Tenors Head-on (Pacific Jazz, 1956)
 Richie Kamuca Quartet  (Mode, 1957)
 Jazz Erotica (HiFi Records 1957), reissued as West Coast Jazz in Hi-Fi (Contemporary, 1959; With Bill Holman, Conte Candoli and Frank Rosolino)
 Roy Eldridge - Richie Kamuca Quintet, Comin' Home Baby (Recorded 1965-66, released 1978 on Pumpkin Productions)
 Richie Kamuca Richie (Jazzz, 1976; reissued by Concord Jazz)
 Richie Kamuca Drop Me Off In Harlem (Concord, 1977)
 Richie Kamuca Richie Kamuca's Charlie (Concord, 1977 [1979])
With Manny Albam
The Jazz Greats of Our Time, Vol. 2 (Coral 1957)  
With Chet Baker and Bud Shank
Theme Music from "The James Dean Story" (Pacific Jazz, 1956)
With Chet Baker and Art Pepper
The Route (Pacific Jazz 1956)
With Herb Ellis and Jimmy Giuffre 
Herb Ellis Meets Jimmy Giuffre (Verve, 1959)
With Maynard Ferguson
Live at Peacock Lane 1956-1957 (Live in Los Angeles, with Kamuca in the band; Fresh Sound CD apparently unreleased on LP in lieu of Birdland recordings of 1957.)     
With Terry Gibbs
The Exciting Terry Gibbs Big Band – reissued as Dream Band, Vol. 4: Main Stem (Contemporary, 1961)Explosion! (Verve 1961, Contemporary, 1987 as Dream Band vol 5) 
With Woody HermanBig New Herd At The Monterey Jazz Festival (Atlantic, 1959)
With Stan KentonPopular Favorites by Stan Kenton (Capitol, 1953)Sketches on Standards (Capitol, 1953)The Kenton Era (Capitol, 1940–54, [1955])Kenton with Voices (Capitol, 1957)Back to Balboa (Capitol, 1958)The Ballad Style of Stan Kenton (Capitol, 1958)Kenton Live from the Las Vegas Tropicana (Capitol, 1959 [1961])
With Gary McFarlandPoint of Departure (Impulse!, 1963)
With Herbie MannMy Kinda Groove (Atlantic, 1964)Our Mann Flute (Atlantic, 1966)
With Shelly ManneSon of Gunn!! (Contemporary, 1959)At the Black Hawk 1 (Contemporary, 1959)At the Black Hawk 2 (Contemporary, 1959)At the Black Hawk 3 (Contemporary, 1959)At the Black Hawk 4 (Contemporary, 1959)At the Black Hawk 5 (Contemporary, 1959 [1991])Ruth Price with Shelly Manne & His Men at the Manne-Hole (Contemporary, 1961) with Ruth PriceLive! Shelly Manne & His Men at the Manne-Hole (Contemporary, 1961)Shelly Manne & His Men Play Checkmate (Contemporary, 1961)
With the Modern Jazz QuartetJazz Dialogue (Atlantic, 1965)
With Anita O'DayCool Heat (Verve, 1959)
With Shorty RogersPortrait of Shorty (RCA Victor, 1957)Chances Are It Swings (RCA Victor, 1958)The Swingin' Nutcracker (RCA Victor, 1960; with Holman, Perkins and Art Pepper, Kamuca was part of the saxophone section on Rogers' big-band jazz version of Tchaikovsky's Nutcracker Suite.)
With Frank RosolinoFrank Rosolino Quintet (Mode 1957)
With Zoot SimsHawthorne Nights (Pablo, 1977)

FilmographyKings Go Forth (1958) - Jazz Musician: Tenor Sax (uncredited)Adventures in Paradise'' (1961, TV Series) - Moody Simmons (final appearance)

References

1930 births
1977 deaths
American jazz tenor saxophonists
American male saxophonists
Deaths from cancer in California
Cool jazz saxophonists
Jazz tenor saxophonists
Musicians from Philadelphia
West Coast jazz saxophonists
20th-century American saxophonists
Jazz musicians from Pennsylvania
20th-century American male musicians
American male jazz musicians
The Capp-Pierce Juggernaut members